Sabelo Mlangeni (born 22 February 1980) is a South African photographer living and working in Johannesburg, South Africa. His work is held in the collections of the Art Institute of Chicago, the San Francisco Museum of Modern Art, and the Walther Collection.

Biography

Sabelo Mlangeni was born in 1980 in Driefontein, a village near Wakkerstroom in Mpumalanga, South Africa.

Publications
 Sabelo Mlangeni: Umlindelo wamaKholwa. Johannesburg: Wits Art Museum, 2018. .

Exhibitions

Solo exhibitions
 2006 Invisible Women, Market Photo Workshop, Johannesburg, South Africa
 2007   Invisible Women, Warren Siebrits Contemporary Morden Art, Johannesburg, South Africa
 2010   This is Our Time, Brodie/Stevenson, Johannesburg, South Africa
 2010   Men Only/At Home, Brodie/Stevenson, Johannesburg, South Africa
 2011   Ghost Towns, Stevenson, Cape Town, South Africa
 2012   Country Girls, Aceberg Projects, Chicago, USA
 2012  Black Men in Dress and Iimbali, Stevenson, Johannesburg, South Africa
 2015   No Problem, Stevenson, Cape Town, South Africa
 2016   Heartbreaker, artSPACE, Auckland, New Zealand
 2017   Kholwa: The Longing of Belonging, Museum of Archeology, Cambridge, UK
 2018   Invisible Women, Memorial Dr. Antonio Agostinho Neto, Luanda, Angola
 2018   Umlindelo wamaKholwa, Wits Art Museum, Johannesburg, South Africa
 2020   The Royal House of Allure, blank projects, Cape Town, South Africa

Group exhibitions
 2008  Look Away, South African Photography Today, Kuckei+Kuckei, Berlin, Germany
 2010 I am not afraid, The Market Photo Workshop, Johannesburg Art Gallery, South Africa
 2010  Afropolis: City, Media, Art, Rautenstrauch-Joest-Museum, Cologne, Germany
 2010 Centre for Contemporary Art, Lagos, Nigeria
 2011  Possible Cities: Africa in photography and video, Cantor Fitzgerald Gallery, Haverford College, Pennsylvania, USA
 2011  Figures and Fictions: Contemporary South African Photography, V&A Museum, London, UK
 2011  Appropriated Landscapes, Walther Collection, Neu-Ulm, Germany
 2011  Lagos Photo Festival, Nigeria
 2011  9th Rencontres de Bamako African Photography Biennale, Mali
 2012  Centre photographie de la de Franse, Paris, France
 2012  Recontres Picha Biennale de Lumbumbashi (Lubumbashi Biennale), DRC
 2013  The Unexpected Guest, Liverpool Biennale exhibition, Liverpool, UK
 2013  Present Tense, Calouse Gulbenkian French Delegation, Paris, France
 2013  Present Tense, Calouse Gulbenkian Foundation, Lisbon, Portugal
 2013  Distance and desire: Encounters with African Archive, Walther Collection, Neu Ulm, Germany
 2013  Rise and Fall of Apartheid: Photography and the Bureaucracy of Everyday Life, Haus der Kunst, Munich, Germany
 2014  Apartheid and After at Huis Marseille, Amsterdam, Netherlands
 2014  Public Intimacy: Art and Social Life in South Africa at the Yerba Buena Center for the Arts, San Francisco, USA
 2015  Making Africa: A Continent of Contemporary Design, Vitra Design Museum, Weil am Rhein, Germany; Guggenheim Bilbao, Spain
 2015 Rise and Fall of Apartheid: Photography and the Bureaucracy of Everyday Life, Museum Africa, Johannesburg
 2016  SEX, Stevenson, Johannesburg
 2016  Close to Home: New Photography from Africa, The Walther Collection Project Space, New York
 2017  Urban Cadence: Street Scenes from Lagos and Johannesburg, Gund Gallery, Ohio
 2017  Recent Histories – New African Photography and Video Art, Walther Collection, Neu-Ulm, Germany
 2018  Tell Freedom. 15 African artists, Kunsthal KAde, Amersfoort, Netherlands
 2018  Invisible Women at Memorial Dr. Antonio Agostinho Neto, Luanda, Angola
 2018  About Whose Land Have I Lit On Now? At Savvy Contemporary, Berlin, Germany
 2018  Africa State of Mind, curated by Ekow Eshun, New Art Exchange, Nottingham, UK
 2018   Both, And, Stevenson, Cape Town, South Africa
 2018  Hacer Noche (Crossing Night), Centro Cultural Santo Domingo, Oaxaca de Juarez, Mexico
 2018  open agenda, blank projects, Cape Town, South Africa
 2018  Recent Histories – New African Photography and Video Art from the Walther Collection, Huis Marseille, Amsterdam
 2019  Mating Birds Vol.2, KZNSA Gallery, Durban, South Africa
 2019  Crossing Night: Regional Identities x Global Context, Museum of Contemporary Art Detroit, Detroit, USA
 2019  The Way She Looks: A History of Female Gazes in African Portraiture, Ryerson Image Centre, Toronto, USA
 2019   How to Build a Lagoon with Just a Bottle of Wine?, Lagos Biennial II, Àkéte Art Foundation, Lagos, Nigeria
 2019   the head the hand, blank projects, Cape Town, South Africa
 2019   Ngoma: Art and Cosmology, Johannesburg Art Gallery, Johannesburg, South Africa

Residencies
 2010  Centre for Contemporary Art, Lagos, Nigeria
 2012  The Center Photographique d'Ile-de-France, Paris, France
 2013  Berlin Fellowship, Akademie der Kunste, Berlin, Germany
 2014  Akademie of art Vienna, Vienna, Austria
 2015  Afrovibes, Amsterdam, Netherlands
 2016  Diep, Haven, Arques la bataille, Normandy, France
 2017   Walther Collection, Neu-Ulm, Germany
 2017  Centre de Art Waza, Lubumbashi, Democratic Republic of Congo
 2018   Ses Ditze Naus, Ibiza, Spain
 2018   A4 Arts Foundation, Cape Town, South Africa

Collections
Mlangeni's work is held in the following public and institutional collections:

 Tate Modern, London, UK
 San Francisco Museum of Modern Art, San Francisco, USA
 Johannesburg Art Gallery, Johannesburg, South Africa
 Walther Collection, Neu-Ulm, Germany
 Art Institute of Chicago, Chicago, USA
 KADIST, Paris, France
 Sasol, Johannesburg, South Africa

References

External links
 Artist CV

Living people
1980 births
People from Mpumalanga
South African photographers